María Gabriela Hernández (born 17 September 2001) is a Nicaraguan swimmer. She competed in the women's 100 metre freestyle event at the 2017 World Aquatics Championships.

References

2001 births
Living people
Nicaraguan female swimmers
Place of birth missing (living people)
Swimmers at the 2019 Pan American Games
Nicaraguan female freestyle swimmers
Pan American Games competitors for Nicaragua